Kierna Mayo is an American writer, editor, and media executive. She started her journalism career as a member of the original writing staff for The Source. Mayo co-founded the lifestyle magazine Honey in 1999, and was later the editor-in-chief of Ebony. Mayo is the vice president and executive editor of Random House and Roc Nation's imprint Roc Lit 101.

Life and career

Early life 
Mayo was born and raised in Brooklyn, New York. She was a fan of hip-hop music during her adolescence, and attended high school at Murry Bergtraum High School with Q-Tip and Ali Shaheed Muhammad (of A Tribe Called Quest fame). She received her bachelor's degree from Hampton University.

Journalism and editing 
Mayo was an original staff writer and editor at The Source, where she worked for four years. Her writing frequently pushed back against sexism in the music industry and blanket criticism of hip hop.

In March 1999, she co-founded and was named the inaugural editor-in-chief of Honey, a bimonthly lifestyle and fashion periodical geared toward young multicultural women. She and her co-founder Joicelyn Dingle sold the magazine and ultimately shuttered it one year later due to creative differences with the new owner. 

Mayo worked as Ebony's editorial director beginning in 2011 and was promoted to editor-in-chief in 2015. A few months into her tenure she attracted both praise and condemnation for a cover depicting the fictional Huxtable family of The Cosby Show in a smashed picture frame. The accompanying article, written by Goldie Taylor, contextualized Cliff Huxtable's legacy in light of the scores of women that accused Bill Cosby of sexual assault and misconduct. 

In 2016, Mayo resigned from her position after Ebony's owners sold the publication to ClearView Partners. Later that year she was named senior vice president of content and brands for Interactive One.

As of 2021 she is the vice president and executive editor at the publishing imprint One World/Roc Lit 101.

Other work 
Mayo wrote the foreword to Joan Morgan's cultural history book, She Begat This: 20 Years of The Miseducation of Lauryn Hill (2018). She also contributed the essay “Hip-Hop Heroines” to the Smithsonian Anthology of Hip-Hip and Rap (2021). 

Mayo appeared as a commentator for On the Record and We Need to Talk About Cosby.

Accolades 
 2015 – The Root 100
 2020 – Equality Now Gala Honoree

References

External links 
 Official website

Year of birth missing (living people)
Living people
African-American women writers
American women editors
African-American founders
African-American women journalists
American media executives
Writers from Brooklyn
Hampton University alumni
African-American feminists